William Graham PC (29 July 1887 – 8 January 1932) was a Scottish Labour politician.

Born in Peebles, he was educated at Peebles Public School and George Heriot's School, Edinburgh. After a time as a junior clerk in the War Office, he became a journalist.

He joined the Independent Labour Party in 1906, and was elected to Edinburgh Town Council in 1913. He gained an MA from University of Edinburgh in 1915, and was later awarded an honorary LLD by the university in 1927.

He served as Labour MP for Edinburgh Central from 1918 until 1931. Early in his parliamentary career he found himself at odds with many Labour MPs and contemplated joining the Liberals. He held office as Financial Secretary to the Treasury in 1924 (when he was sworn as a Privy Councillor) and as President of the Board of Trade from 1929 to 1931. He was responsible for the Coal-Mines Bill, several overseas missions, and industrial inquiries. He was appointed a Privy Counsellor in 1924. He also served on the Royal Commissions on income-tax in 1919, and Oxford and Cambridge in 1920–1921, and was a Member of the Speaker's Conference on Devolution in 1919–1920. He was also a Member of the Medical Research Council from 1920 to 1928.

He was joint Deputy Leader of the Labour Party from 1931 until his death from pneumonia in 1932.

References

External links 
 

1887 births
1932 deaths
Councillors in Edinburgh
Scottish Labour MPs
UK MPs 1918–1922
UK MPs 1922–1923
UK MPs 1923–1924
UK MPs 1924–1929
UK MPs 1929–1931
Members of the Privy Council of the United Kingdom
People from Peebles
People educated at George Heriot's School
Alumni of the University of Edinburgh
Members of the Parliament of the United Kingdom for Edinburgh constituencies
Presidents of the Board of Trade
Deaths from pneumonia in England